Charles "Charley" Puleri (born March 1, 1969) is a former professional football quarterback.

Career 
Puleri signed to the Sacramento Gold Miners in 1993. He spent the vast majority of his career in the minor leagues, playing at various points in his career with the Miami Hooters, Texas Terror, Iowa Barnstormers, Detroit Fury, Buffalo Destroyers, London Monarchs and, during the 2000 preseason, the Dallas Cowboys. Unusually for a quarterback, Puleri played ironman in arena football, seeing limited playing time on defense and special teams.

Puleri is best known for his time with the New York/New Jersey Hitmen of the XFL. In 2001, Puleri, a native of New York City, signed with his hometown team. Puleri would be the starting quarterback in the XFL's first game, leading the Hitmen against the Las Vegas Outlaws on national television. Puleri's tenure as the Hitmen's starting quarterback proved to be a disastrous embarrassment for both him and the league as a whole, as he was repeatedly sacked and turned the ball over numerous times, making the league's level of talent look bad and partially prompting the mass decline in viewers as the season progressed. After a short quarterback controversy, Puleri was benched in favor of Wally Richardson (a former NFL backup for the Baltimore Ravens and Atlanta Falcons) during the second week of the season. (Puleri's struggles were later attributed to the ball's slippery texture, which was later solved by using sandpaper and wirebrush to roughen the surface.
)

References

1969 births
Living people
New Mexico State Aggies football players
Miami Hooters players
Texas Terror players
Iowa Barnstormers players
New Jersey Red Dogs players
Detroit Fury players
Buffalo Destroyers players
New York/New Jersey Hitmen players
London Monarchs players
Sportspeople from the Bronx
Players of American football from New York City
Sacramento Gold Miners players
American football quarterbacks